The Quest of the Absolute (French: La Recherche de l'absolu) is a novel by Honoré de Balzac. The novel first appeared in 1834, with seven chapter-divisions, as a Scène de la vie privée; was published by itself in 1839 by Charpentier; and took its final place as a part of the Comédie in 1845.

The astronomer Ernest Laugier helped Balzac in the use of chemical terminology in this novel.

In Popular Culture 

In François Truffaut's 1959 film The 400 Blows, teenager Antoine Doinel idolized Balzac's work and depicted 'my grandfather's death' in a school essay, which was fundamentally based on the plots of 'The Quest of the Absolute' from his memory, his teacher accused him of plagiarizing, which eventually led to his quit of school.

References

External links
 
 Scott Sprenger, "In the End Was the Word: Balzac's Modernist Absolute," Anthropoetics VII, no. 1 Spring/ Summer 2001. 

1834 French novels
Books of La Comédie humaine
Novels by Honoré de Balzac